This is a list of players who have played at least one game for the Arizona Coyotes (1996–97 to present) of the National Hockey League (NHL). This list does not include players for the Winnipeg Jets of the NHL and World Hockey Association (WHA).


Key
  Current Coyote player.
  Current NHL player.
  Hockey Hall of Famer, or retired number.

The "Seasons" column lists the first year of the season of the player's first game and the last year of the season of the player's last game. For example, a player who played one game in the 2000–2001 season would be listed as playing with the team from 2000–2001, regardless of what calendar year the game occurred within.

Statistics complete as of the 2020–2021 NHL season.

Goaltenders

Skaters

See also
List of NHL players

Notes

a: As of the 2005–2006 NHL season, all games have a winner; teams losing in overtime and shootouts are awarded one point thus the OTL stat replacees the tie statistic. The OTL column also includes SOL (Shootout losses).

References 
General
All-time roster for the Phoenix Coyotes of the NHL on hockeydb.com
National Hockey League Career Stats (sortable) on NHL.com
Specific

Arizona Coyotes

players